Archives of Osteoporosis  is a peer-reviewed medical journal published by Springer Science+Business Media. It was established in 2006 and is an official journal of the International Osteoporosis Foundation and the United States' National Osteoporosis Foundation. The journal is published yearly and covers the specificities of regions around the world concerning epidemiology, including reference values for bone density and bone metabolism, as well as clinical aspects of osteoporosis and other bone diseases. The current co-editors-in-chief are John Kanis and Felicia Cosman.

References

External links

National Osteoporosis Foundation

Publications established in 2006
English-language journals
Annual journals
Springer Science+Business Media academic journals
Orthopedics journals